Nicolaas ("Nico") Hendricus Johannes van den Boogaard (28 October 1938, Amsterdam – 25 December 1982, Heemstede) was a medievalist scholar, professor, and dean of the Faculty of Letters at the University of Amsterdam.

Career
In addition to his work as a teacher and administrator, he published widely on medieval French literature. His doctoral dissertation, Rondeaux et refrains du XIIe siècle au début du XIVe: Collationnement, introduction et notes (Paris: Klincksieck, 1969), continues to be cited. This dissertation built a corpus of Old French lyric poetry that Van den Boogaard then put into a computer database. In 1970, he 
enlarged the database and generated statistical information about several genres of medieval French literature. He was a pioneer in the field of digital humanities, as well as a scholar of Old French philology and literature.

He did not live to see it published. He died unexpectedly of cardiac arrest at age 44, on Christmas Day in 1982. Paul Zumthor's obituary of Nico H. J. Van Den Boogaard was published in Cahiers de civilisation médiévale 26.103 (1983): pp. 279–281.

Many of the medievalist articles that Van den Boogaard wrote between 1962 and 1982 were republished after his death in the anthology Autour de 1300: Etudes de philologie et de littérature médiévales (Amsterdam: Rodopi, 1985),  / . A bibliography of his publications, listing two dozen articles as well as book reviews and collaborative papers, is included in the introduction to Autour de 1300, pages xxi-xxiv.

Van den Boogaard's style of academic writing was modern, modest, interdisciplinary, good-humored, and accessible to a broad audience.

1938 births
1982 deaths
Dutch medievalists
Dutch philologists

Romance philologists
University of Amsterdam alumni
Academic staff of the University of Amsterdam
20th-century philologists